Olivopontocerebellar atrophy (OPCA) is the degeneration of neurons in specific areas of the brain – the cerebellum, pons, and inferior olivary nucleus. OPCA is present in several neurodegenerative syndromes, including inherited and non-inherited forms of ataxia (such as the hereditary spinocerebellar ataxia known as Machado–Joseph disease) and multiple system atrophy (MSA), with which it is primarily associated.

OPCA  may also be found in the brains of individuals with prion disorders and inherited metabolic diseases.  The characteristic areas of brain damage that indicate OPCA can be seen by imaging the brain using CT scans or MRI studies.

The term was originally coined by Joseph Jules Dejerine and André Thomas.

Signs and symptoms
OPCA is characterized by progressive cerebellar ataxia, leading to clumsiness in body movements, veering from midline when walking, wide-based stance, and falls without signs of paralysis or weakness. Clinical presentation can vary greatly between patients, but mostly affects speech, balance and walking.  Other possible neurological problems include spasmodic dysphonia, hypertonia, hyperreflexia, rigidity, dysarthria, dysphagia and neck dystonic posture.

Cause
Olivopontocerebellar atrophy is hereditary, but has an unknown genetic basis.  There are two forms:

A few non-hereditary diseases formerly categorized as olivopontocerebellar atrophy have been reclassified as forms of multiple system atrophy as well as to four hereditary types, that have been currently reclassified as four different forms of spinocerebellar ataxia:

Diagnosis
A diagnosis of olivopontocerebellar atrophy (OPCA) may be based on a thorough medical exam; the presence of signs and symptoms; imaging studies; various laboratory tests; and an evaluation of the family history.

MRI of the brain may show characteristics of OPCA, such as specific changes in the size of affected parts of the brain. This is more likely as the disease progresses; it is possible to have OPCA and have a normal brain MRI (especially within the first year of symptom onset).

Hereditary OPCA may be suspected based on having a family history, and may be diagnosed by genetic testing (when available) for the condition suspected or known to be present in the family. Sporadic OPCA may be diagnosed if hereditary forms of OPCA, and other conditions associated with OPCA, have been ruled out.

Treatment
Physiotherapy intervention aims to improve balance and gait of OPCA patients, by stimulating neuroplastic changes in the atrophied neural structure. A challenge-oriented treatment program has previously been shown to be beneficial for individuals with ataxia from OPCA. The treatment program was composed of repetitive training with task challenges (e.g. obstacle course) and/or novel motor skills acquisition over a 12-week period under the supervision of a physiotherapist. Task challenges were progressed only when the patient showed mastery of a task.

Overground harness systems may be used to allow OPCA patients to challenge their balance without chance of falling. Furthermore, home exercise programs and/or aquatic exercises are used to allow more repetitions to facilitate balance learning. Treatment programs should be frequently monitored and adjusted based on a patient's progress. Outcome measures such as the Berg Balance Scale, Dynamic Gait Index and activities-specific balance confidence scales are useful to assess patient's progress over time.

See also
Olivopontocerebellar atrophy-deafness syndrome

References

External links 

 

Brain disorders